The women's 4 × 100 metre medley relay competition of the swimming events at the 2015 Pan American Games took place on July 18 at the CIBC Pan Am/Parapan Am Aquatics Centre and Field House in Toronto, Canada. The defending Pan American Games champion is the United States.

This race consisted of eight lengths of the pool. Each of the four swimmers completed two lengths of the pool. The order of swimming styles is: Backstroke, Breaststroke, Butterfly and Freestyle. The first swimmer had to touch the wall before the second could leave the starting block.

Records
Prior to this competition, the existing world and Pan American Games records were as follows:

The following new records were set during this competition.

Schedule

All times are Eastern Time Zone (UTC-4).

Results

Heats
The first round was held on July 18.
As only eight teams had entered, the heats served as a ranking round with all eight teams advancing to the final.

Final 
The final was held on July 18.

References

Swimming at the 2015 Pan American Games
4 × 100 metre medley relay
2015 in women's swimming